Beber may refer to:

Beber (Ohre), a river in Germany
Ambrosius Beber (fl. 1610–1620), a German composer
Bruna Beber (born 1984), Brazilian poet
Dalirio Beber (born 1949) Brazilian politician
Joyce Beber (1929–2010), an American advertising executive
Neena Beber, American television producer
Tonya Van Beber, American politician

See also
Biber (disambiguation)
Bieber (disambiguation)